Hua can refer to varieties of the following languages:

The Hua (Huva) dialect of the Yagaria language of Papua New Guinea
The Eastern ǂHuan dialect of the ǂ’Amkoe language of Botswana
The Western ǂHuan dialect of the ǃXoon language of Botswana
Standard Chinese in Southeast Asia